Jim Love was an Australian professional rugby league footballer who played in the 1910s and 1920s.  He played for Balmain as a fullback but also played on the wing.

Playing career
Love made his debut in 1918 for Balmain against Annandale.  Love made 3 appearances for the club the following year as Balmain won the premiership in 1919.  

In 1920, he made 3 appearances again as Balmain claimed the premiership for a second consecutive year.  On both occasions there was no grand final in place so Balmain claimed the premierships by finishing first.  In 1924, Love played on the wing in Balmain's 3–0 victory over Souths in the 1924 NSWRL grand final.  

Love played a further 3 seasons before retiring at the end of the 1927 season.  Love also represented New South Wales on 2 occasions in 1925.

References

Balmain Tigers players
New South Wales rugby league team players
Australian rugby league players
Rugby league players from Sydney
Rugby league wingers
Rugby league fullbacks